James Carr Walton (born June 7, 1948) is an American businessman, currently the heir to the fortune of Walmart, the world's largest retailer. As of October 2022, Walton was the seventeenth-richest person in the world, with a net worth of US$61 billion according to Bloomberg Billionaires Index. He is the youngest son of Sam Walton.

Early life and family
Jim Walton was born in Newport, Jackson County, Arkansas, the third child of Walmart co-founder Sam Walton (1918–1992) and Helen Walton (1919–2007), with siblings Rob Walton, Alice Walton, and John Walton (1946 – 2005). After graduating from Bentonville High School in 1965 where he was president of his junior class, played football at all-state level and also learned to fly a plane, Walton received a bachelor's degree in Business Administration in Marketing from the University of Arkansas in Fayetteville, Arkansas in 1971, where he was also a member of the Lambda Chi Alpha fraternity. In 1972, he joined Walmart and was involved in its real-estate dealings. After serving for four years, he moved to the family owned Walton Enterprises as president in 1975.

Career
On September 28, 2005, Walton replaced his deceased brother, John, on the Wal-Mart Board of Directors. He is currently on the Strategic Planning and Finance committees. He was CEO of his family owned Arvest Bank, until becoming Chairman of Arvest Bank, and chairman of newspaper firm Community Publishers Inc. (CPI) owned by Jim Walton himself (but founded by his father Sam Walton after acquiring the local newspaper the Benton County Daily Record, both operating in Arkansas, Missouri, and Oklahoma). He has pledged about $2 billion to the Walton Family Foundation along with his siblings from 2008 to 2013.

In September 2016, Walton was reported to own over 152 million of Walmart shares worth over $11 billion (US).

Personal life
He and his wife, Lynne McNabb Walton, have four children: Alice A. Proietti (born November 1979), Steuart Walton (born April 1981), Thomas L. Walton (born September 1983), and James M. Walton (born August 1987). The family resides in Bentonville, Arkansas.

In 2014, he was ranked at #10 on the Forbes list of billionaires with a net worth of $34.7 billion that has increased by $3 billion. On the 2013 Forbes 400 list of the richest people in America he is ranked at #7. As of March 2019, he was ranked as the 16th-richest person in the world, with an estimated net worth of $45.7 billion.

See also
Walton family
Walmart

References

1948 births
American bankers
American billionaires
American corporate directors
American retail chief executives
Businesspeople from Arkansas
Directors of Walmart
Living people
University of Arkansas alumni
People from Newport, Arkansas
People from Bentonville, Arkansas